City of Angels may refer to:

Places 
 Angeles City
 Angelópolis, Colombia
 Angels Camp, California, a city in Calaveras County, California, United States
 Bangkok, Thailand, whose abbreviated Thai name Krung Thep literally means "City of Angels"
 Kiryat Malakhi, a city in Southern District, Israel
 Los Angeles, United States, widely nicknamed "City of Angels" ("the angels" is the literal translation in Spanish of "Los Ángeles")
 Puebla (city), Mexico, formerly known as Puebla de los Ángeles, and popularly known as Ciudad de los Ángeles or Angelópolis (City of the Angels)
 Angelópolis (Puebla), a commercial and residential area in the city
 Toruń, Poland, name comes from city coat of arms, which includes the Angel

Film, soundtracks and stage
 City of Angels (film), a 1998 American film starring Meg Ryan and Nicolas Cage
 City of Angels (soundtrack), the soundtrack for the 1998 film
 The Crow: City of Angels, a 1996 American film starring Vincent Perez and Iggy Pop
 City of Angels (musical), a musical comedy which ran on Broadway from 1989 to 1992

Music

Albums
 City of Angels (The Miracles album), 1975
 City of Angels, a 1988 album by Akiko Kobayashi
 City of Angels (Vanessa Amorosi album), 2022

Songs
 "City of Angels" (24kGoldn song), 2020
 "City of Angels" (Thirty Seconds to Mars song), 2013
 "City of Angels", a song by 10,000 Maniacs from their 1987 album In My Tribe
 "City of Angels", a song by Above the Law from the soundtrack for The Crow: City of Angels
 "City of Angels", a song by Demi Lovato from Holy Fvck, 2022
 "City of Angels", a song by The Distillers from their album Sing Sing Death House
 "City of the Angels", a 1980 song by Journey from their album Evolution
 "City of Angels", a song by Miguel from his 2017 album War & Leisure
 "City of Angels", a song by Nik Kershaw from his 1984 album The Riddle
"City of Angels", a song by Wang Chung from their 1985 album To Live and Die in L.A. (soundtrack)
 "Under the Bridge", a 1991 song by the Red Hot Chili Peppers, often mistakenly named "City of Angels"
 "In the City of Angels", a 1962 song by Harold Adamson and Jimmy McHugh, In the City of Angels a theme song that Vin Scully used title in his Sept. 9, 1965 broadcast of Sandy Koufax's perfect game."

Television 
 City of Angels (1976 TV series), a short-lived television series starring Wayne Rogers as a private detective in 1930s Los Angeles on NBC
 City of Angels (2000 TV series), a short-lived medical drama set in modern-day Los Angeles on CBS in 2000
 "City of Angels" (Glee), an episode of Glee
 "City Of", the premiere episode of the TV series Angel, mislabeled "City of Angels" on some DVDs
 Penny Dreadful: City of Angels, 2020 American dark fantasy series

Other uses
 City of Angels FC, a semi-professional soccer club based in Los Angeles, United States